The following article presents a summary of the 1929 football (soccer) season in Brazil, which was the 28th season of competitive football in the country.

Campeonato Paulista

In 1929 there were two different editions of the Campeonato Paulista. One was organized by the Associação Paulista de Esportes Atléticos (APEA) while the other one was organized by the Liga de Amadores de Futebol (LAF).

APEA's Campeonato Paulista

Final Standings

Corinthians declared as the APEA's Campeonato Paulista champions.

LAF's Campeonato Paulista

Final Standings

The LAF's Campeonato Paulista was not concluded as APEA's and LAF's competitions fused, and Paulistano was declared as the LAF's Campeonato Paulista champions.

State championship champions

Other competition champions

Brazil national team
The following table lists all the games played by the Brazil national football team in official competitions and friendly matches during 1929.

References
 Brazilian competitions at RSSSF
 1929 Brazil national team matches at RSSSF